The Mysterious Mr. Davis is a 1939 British comedy drama film directed by Claude Autant-Lara and starring Henry Kendall, Kathleen Kelly and Alastair Sim. It was made as a quota quickie and distributed by the American company RKO Pictures. It was based on the 1928 novel The Partner by Jenaro Prieto and was released the same year as an Italian adaptation The Silent Partner.

Cast
 Henry Kendall as Julian Roscoe  
 Kathleen Kelly as Audrey Roscoe  
 Richard Gofe as Teddy Roscoe 
 Alastair Sim as Theodore F. Wilcox - the Lunatic  
 Morris Harvey as Samuel Goldenburg  
 Jeanne Stuart as Anita Goldenburg 
 A. Bromley Davenport as Lord Avonmouth  
 Guy Middleton as Milton  
 Quentin McPhearson as The Landlord  
 Ben Field as The Decorator  
 Fred Duprez as Wilcox  
 Alfred Wellesley as The Pawnbroker 
 Ethel Griffies as Mabel Wilcox  
 May Hallatt as Telegraph Clerk

Critical reception
Allmovie described it as "Mild and dated."

References

Bibliography
Chibnall, Steve. Quota Quickies: The Birth of the British 'B' Film. British Film Institute, 2007. (Indexed under the US title My Partner, Mr Davis.)

External links

1939 films
1939 comedy-drama films
British comedy-drama films
Films directed by Claude Autant-Lara
Films based on Chilean novels
Quota quickies
Films set in London
British black-and-white films
1930s English-language films
1930s British films